Tollywood films of the 1960s may refer to:

 Bengali films of the 1960s
 Telugu films of the 1960s